Sellin is a municipality on the Island of Rügen, in Mecklenburg-Vorpommern, Germany.

History 

First mentions of Sellin date to 1295. From 1880 on, the town gained importance as a Baltic Sea spa town.
After the Wende in 1989, the building stock in the village was extensively renovated. In 1992, Sellin Pier was rebuilt and was officially opened on 2 April 1998.

Culture and sights 

Wilhelmstraße, with its houses from the resort architecture period (turn of the 19th and 20th century), runs up to the steep coast, up to 30 metres high - where there is a steep flight of steps or a lift to Sellin Pier or the promenade on the South Beach (Südstrand).

Sellin has the longest pier on Rügen: 394 metres. Since 1991 the historic centre has been thoroughly renovated as part of a programme of urban development.

Other sights are the Galerie Hartwich in the old fire station (Feuerwehrhaus), the Amber Museum with its associated workshop and the Gnadenkirche. The Sellin Amber Museum was founded in 1999 and is the only one on Rügen.

The lake of Schwarzer See in the Granitz also belongs to the municipality and has been designated a strict nature reserve.

Personalities 

 Sophie Taeuber-Arp (1889-1943), the Swiss painter was in 1923 vacation guest
 Albert Einstein (1879-1955), physicist and Nobel Prize winner in 1921, was guest in the summer of 1915

References

External links

 Sellin - Official website

 
Seaside resorts in Germany
Towns and villages on Rügen
Populated coastal places in Germany (Baltic Sea)